Ranx may refer to
 Ranx or RanXerox, a science fiction graphic novel series
 Ranx, a 1990 video game based on the RanXerox graphic novel Ranx à New-York

Surname 
 Coolie Ranx, a musician
 Delly Ranx, a Jamaican dancehall deejay and record producer
 Robbo Ranx, a UK dancehall and reggae deejay
 Biga Ranx, a French reggae/hip-hop artist